En enda gång is a 1992 studio album from Kikki Danielsson & Roosarna. The tracks "En enda gång", "Kvällens sista dans" and "Natt efter natt" were tested for Svensktoppen, but only "En enda gång" managed to enter the chart.

Track listing

Side A

Side B

References 

1992 albums
Kikki Danielsson albums
Roosarna albums